The NEWMAC men's basketball tournament is the annual conference basketball championship tournament for the NCAA Division III New England Women's and Men's Athletic Conference. The tournament has been held annually since 1999. It is a single-elimination tournament and seeding is based on regular season records.

The winner, declared conference champion, receives the NEWMAC's automatic bid to the NCAA Men's Division III Basketball Championship.

Results

Championship records

References

NCAA Division III men's basketball conference tournaments
Basketball Tournament, Men's
Recurring sporting events established in 1999